The canton of Chaniers is an administrative division of the Charente-Maritime department, western France. It was created at the French canton reorganisation which came into effect in March 2015. Its seat is in Chaniers.

It consists of the following communes:

Aujac
Aumagne
Authon-Ébéon
Bercloux
Brizambourg
Burie
Bussac-sur-Charente
Chaniers
La Chapelle-des-Pots
Chérac
Dompierre-sur-Charente
Le Douhet
Écoyeux
Fontcouverte
Juicq
Migron
Nantillé
Saint-Bris-des-Bois
Saint-Césaire
Sainte-Même
Saint-Hilaire-de-Villefranche
Saint-Sauvant
Saint-Vaize
Le Seure
Vénérand
Villars-les-Bois

References

Cantons of Charente-Maritime